Bluebeard's Eighth Wife is a 1938 Paramount Pictures American romantic comedy film directed and produced by Ernst Lubitsch and starring Claudette Colbert and Gary Cooper. The film is based on the 1921 French play La huitième femme de Barbe-Bleue by Alfred Savoir and the English translation of the play by Charlton Andrews. The screenplay was the first of many collaborations between Charles Brackett and Billy Wilder. The film is a remake of the 1923 silent version directed by Sam Wood and starring Gloria Swanson.

Bluebeard’s Eighth Wife failed at the box office, and Paramount Pictures released Lubitsch to go to Metro-Goldwyn-Mayer.

Plot
"Once the premise is established that Claudette Colbert wants to deflate the multi-millionaire Gary Cooper, who buys his wives – seven of ’em prior to her – as he buys a fancy motor car, making pre-marriage settlements with them, etc, it then becomes an always obvious farce." — Abel Green, Variety

On the French Riviera, wealthy businessman Michael Brandon wants to buy pajamas, but just the tops. When the store refuses to sell the pajamas without the pants, an attractive woman named Nicole offers to buy the bottoms. The two engage in a flirtatious conversation about Michael's insomnia, as Michael tries to figure out if the pajama bottoms are for a family member or lover.

At his hotel, Michael has trouble sleeping, so the managers offer him a suite on a higher floor, further away from the sounds of the sea. The suite is still occupied by the Marquis de Loiselle, whose hotel account is two months in arrears. The marquis attempts to make a business proposition to Michael, who refuses. However, when Michael recognizes the Marquis' pajama bottoms, he realizes that Nicole is his daughter. Michael alters his opinion of the marquis and buys a bathtub from him that was supposedly once owned by King Louis XIV. He then pursues Nicole and proposes marriage to her the same day. She turns him down, but eventually changes her mind and accepts.

Nicole is horrified to learn that Michael has been married seven times previously. Determined to stick around, she calls off the wedding, much to her father's dismay. Michael explains that he gives each of his wives a prenuptial agreement guaranteeing $50,000 a year for life if they should divorce. He eventually assents to Nicole's demand for twice that amount.

During the couple's honeymoon in Czechoslovakia and later at their home in Paris, Nicole keeps her discontented husband at arm's length. He assumes that she is hoping to obtain a divorce, but this only strengthens his natural tenacity and his determination not to grant her one. It is implied that what she actually wants is to keep him interested by frustrating him so that he will not grow tired of her as he did with the previous seven. After reading Shakespeare's The Taming of the Shrew, Michael tries to follow Petruchio's example by "taming" his wife, but Nicole proves too strong for him, slapping him back when he slaps her and biting him (then tenderly treating him with iodine) when he spanks her.

Nicole writes anonymous letters to Michael claiming that she has a lover, but Monsieur Pepinard, the private detective whom Michael hires, assures him that the claim is false. Nicole then blackmails Pepinard into finding her a fake lover, a boxer named Kid Mulligan, so that Michael can catch her alone with him and get knocked unconscious. Complications ensue when her friend Count Albert De Regnier picks the wrong time to return a purse that she had left behind and is mistaken for her husband by Kid Mulligan, and gets knocked out. Michael assumes that Albert is her lover and finally gives her a divorce.

Six months later, Michael has a nervous breakdown. Nicole tries to see him in the sanitarium, but is not allowed in. Michael has been fitted with a straitjacket after spotting her father, who has arranged for her to enter by buying the sanitarium with their new wealth. Nicole tells Michael that she loved him at first sight, but had to break him of his habit of marrying so often. Now that she is financially independent, she explains, he can see that she does not want to remarry him for his money. He frees himself from his straitjacket, advances on her menacingly, then embraces her.

Cast

Music
"Lookie, Lookie, Lookie, Here Comes Cookie", lyrics and music by Mack Gordon, sung by Gary Cooper.

Production
In 1936, Wilder signs a employment contract with Paramount Pictures, then Manny Wolf, story editor and Paramount writer's department head, teamed him with Charles Brackett. Wolf suggested to Lubitsch to have them write Bluebeard’s Eighth Wife, thus matching Lubitsch with a younger writer, influencing Wilder to write more modern than the script for Angel. For a year, teamed together by the studio, Lubitsch supervised Wilder and Brackett cowriting Bluebeard’s Eighth Wife. On 11 October 1937, filming began, finishing in January 1938, for $1.3 million.

Reception
New York Times critic Frank Nugent wrote that Gary Cooper was badly miscast as the millionaire.

Variety wrote: "It's a light and sometimes bright entertainment, but gets a bit tiresome, despite its comparatively moderate running time. ... The Brackett-Wilder scripting is ofttimes bright but illogical and fragile."

"In Nancy Meyers' The Holiday (2006), Arthur (Eli Wallach), an elderly screenwriter who peaked during Hollywood's Golden Era, describes a meet-cute by paraphrasing the opening of Ernst Lubitsch's Bluebeard's Eighth Wife." — Kayla McCulloch

Further reading

References

External links

 
 
 
 

1938 films
1938 romantic comedy films
1930s screwball comedy films
Remakes of American films
American romantic comedy films
American screwball comedy films
American black-and-white films
American films based on plays
Films directed by Ernst Lubitsch
Films scored by Friedrich Hollaender
Films set on the French Riviera
Films set in Paris
Paramount Pictures films
Films with screenplays by Billy Wilder
Films with screenplays by Charles Brackett
Sound film remakes of silent films
1930s English-language films
1930s American films
Films based on Bluebeard